The 1981 NCAA Division II Field Hockey Championship was the first annual NCAA-sponsored tournament to determine the top Division II women's college field hockey team in the United States.

The semifinals and championship of the inaugural event were played at Pfeiffer College in Misenheimer, North Carolina.

Qualified teams
 Four teams qualified for the inaugural tournament.

Bracket

See also 
NCAA Division I Field Hockey Championship
NCAA Division III Field Hockey Championship

References 

1981
1981 in American women's sports
1981 in women's field hockey
1981 in sports in North Carolina
Women's sports in North Carolina